The Yeshiva University Museum is a teaching museum and the cultural arm of Yeshiva University. Along with the American Jewish Historical Society, the American Sephardi Federation, the Leo Baeck Institute, New York and the YIVO Institute for Jewish Research, it is a member organization of the Center for Jewish History, a Smithsonian Institution affiliate located in New York’s Chelsea neighborhood.

History and mission 
The museum was founded in 1973. Its mission is to celebrate the culturally diverse intellectual and artistic achievements of 3,000 years of Jewish experience. The museum aims to provide a window into Jewish culture around the world and throughout history through multi-disciplinary exhibitions and publications. Following the retirement of Sylvia A. Herskowitz, Dr. Jacob Wisse was appointed the museum’s director on February 26, 2009.

Collection 
The museum’s collection of more than 8,000 artifacts includes fine and folk art, ethnographic and archaeological artifacts, clothing and textiles, Jewish ceremonial art objects, documents, books, and manuscripts.

Highlights of the collection include:
 Archaeological artifacts dating from the Bronze Age to Late Antiquity
 Historic illuminated manuscripts such as one from 1478 recording the Simon of Trent blood libel trial
 Thomas Jefferson's handwritten letter of 1818 affirming religious freedom and denouncing anti-Semitism
 The Torah scroll and tefillin purported to belong to the Baal Shem Tov, founder of the Hasidic movement
 A model of Herod's Temple by Leen Ritmeyer
Yeshiva University Museum’s holdings embrace several significant collections of Jewish art and material culture, including:
 Models of historic synagogues commissioned for the museum’s founding
 Meyerhoff Collection of Early Israeli Art
 Jean Moldovan Collection of Jewish Children’s books
 Raphael Patai Amulet Collection
 Max Stern Collection of Judaica
 "Aishet Hayil: Woman of Valor" from the Book of Proverbs by Siri Berg

Facilities and programs 
The museum consists of four galleries, an exhibition arcade, an outdoor sculpture garden, a docent lounge, a children’s workshop room, and a suite of offices. Other Center for Jewish History facilities include a 250-seat handicapped-accessible auditorium and projection room, meeting rooms, a lunchroom, and a kosher café.

The museum produces two types of exhibitions, usually shown concurrently: one examining a Jewish community or historic event, and the other featuring contemporary artists working on Jewish themes. The museum occasionally presents traveling exhibitions. Other offerings include family craft workshops, lectures, films, concerts, and multilingual exhibition tours in English, Hebrew, Spanish, Russian, and Yiddish.

The Yeshiva University Museum’s outreach programs work with New York City public schools to provide students with art education and teachers with professional development. The New York State Council on the Arts, Project Arts of the New York City Board of Education, and the bilingual education program Title VII support these programs. A founding member of the Council of American Jewish Museums, Yeshiva University Museum plays a leading role in encouraging the growth of emerging museums and in developing conservation and preservation techniques for all Jewish museums.

Awards 

 1981: National Jewish Book Award in the Visual Arts category for Purim: The Face and the Mask

See also

List of university art museums and galleries in New York State

References

External links 

 Yeshiva University Museum
 Center for Jewish History
 Council of American Jewish Museums

1973 establishments in New York City
Art museums and galleries in New York City
Chelsea, Manhattan
Jewish museums in New York City
Jews and Judaism in Manhattan
Museums established in 1973
Museums in Manhattan
Religious museums in New York (state)
Yeshiva University
Smithsonian Institution affiliates
University art museums and galleries in New York City
History museums in New York City